Stigmella villosella is a moth of the family Nepticulidae. It is found in the United States in Texas, Ohio, Kentucky and Pennsylvania.

The wingspan is 2.8-4.6 mm. Late instar larvae have been found in the middle of June and latter part of July and October in Cincinnati. Adults have been collected in May and late June to the middle of July, indicating that there are at least two and possibly three generations per year.

The larvae feed on Rubus species, including Rubus occidentalis. They mine the leaves of their host plant.  The mine is a long, very narrow, serpentine tract on the upper surface of the leaf. The frass is deposited centrally as a dense black line becoming more diffuse in the distal fifth of the mine.

External links
Nepticulidae of North America
A taxonomic revision of the North American species of Stigmella (Lepidoptera: Nepticulidae)

Nepticulidae
Moths of North America
Moths described in 1861